The Seven Deadly Enemies of Man (also known as the Seven Deadly Sins), is the name of a group of fictional demon characters appearing in American comic books published by DC Comics. They debuted in Whiz Comics #2 and were created by C.C. Beck and Bill Parker. 

The Seven Deadly Enemies of Man made their cinematic debut in the DC Extended Universe film Shazam!, released in 2019 by New Line Cinema and Warner Bros.

The members of the Seven Deadly Enemies of Man are based on the original Seven Deadly Sins, ie: Pride, Envy, Greed, Wrath, Sloth, Gluttony, and Lust.

Fictional character biography
The Seven Deadly Sins are seven powerful demons, based upon the seven deadly sins enumerated in Christianity, who can take control of both humans and superheroes. The Sins were captured by the wizard Shazam many years ago, and encased in seven mockingly cartoon-like stone statues. The seven statues housing each demon are on display in Shazam's underground lair in the subway in the original comics, and in the Rock of Eternity in the modern comics. The demons have escaped their prisons several times to cause havoc, usually freed by another villain and often being reimprisoned by Captain Marvel.

In the original Fawcett Comics and pre-2000s DC Comics appearances, the Seven Sins were "censored" to an extent in keeping with kid-friendly comics standards. They were identified as the '"Seven Deadly Enemies of Man" and included Pride, Envy, Greed, Hatred, Laziness, Selfishness, and Injustice among their ranks. Their first modern appearance, in World's Finest Comics #262 (April–May 1980), shows how they were originally captured and placed in their statue prisons at the Rock of Eternity.

Most post-2000 appearances of the Seven Deadly Sins identify them by their traditional theological versions (Pride, Envy, Greed, Anger, Sloth, Gluttony, and Lust). In the current New 52/DC Rebirth continuity of the main DC Comics universe, the mythological figure Pandora was responsible for initially freeing the Sins in ancient times by opening what became known as Pandora's box.

In order for Black Adam to distract the Shazam Family while he and Doctor Sivana went to the Monsterlands to free the Monster Society of Evil, Mister Mind summoned the Seven Deadly Enemies of Man who assist Black Adam in attacking Shazam and Lady Shazam up to the point where Shazam shared his powers with his biological father C.C. Batson. There was a flux in the powers between C.C. Batson and Mary Bromfield that affected their fight with Black Adam and the Seven Deadly Enemies of Man. This went back and forth until the Wizard teleported them to Wozenderlands before Black Adam and the Seven Deadly Enemies of Man can do their next attack.

During the "Dark Nights: Death Metal" storyline, the Rock of Eternity fell into Fawcett City when The Batman Who Laughs remade Earth into his vision. This led to the Seven Deadly Enemies of Man being freed.

Members

Current incarnation
 Pride - The strongest of the Seven Deadly Enemies of Man.
 Envy -  The enviest of the Enemies
 Greed - The greediest of the Enemies.
 Wrath - The wrathfullest of the Enemies.
 Sloth - The slothest of the Enemies.
 Gluttony - The most gluttonous of the Enemies
 Lust - The entity has a siren power.

Fawcett Comics and pre-2000s DC Comics
 Hatred
 Laziness
 Selfishness
 Injustice

In other media

Television
 The Seven Deadly Enemies of Man appear in the Batman: The Brave and the Bold episode "The Power of Shazam!".
 The Seven Deadly Enemies of Man appear in the Teen Titans Go! episode "Little Elvis".

Film
 The Seven Deadly Sins appear in Superman/Shazam!: The Return of Black Adam.
 The Seven Deadly Sins appear in Lego DC Super Hero Girls: Super-Villain High, all voiced by Fred Tatasciore.
 The Seven Deadly Sins appear in Shazam!, voiced by Steve Blum, Darin De Paul, and Fred Tatasciore. This version of the group each possess differing demonic forms and characteristics that reflect their namesake. Pride has horns, wings, and extendable claws; Greed has four arms; Wrath has a muscular build; Sloth's arms are made up of many tentacles; the obese Gluttony's mouth opens from his face to the stomach; Lust has a long tentacle-like tongue; and Envy is the smallest and weakest. Additionally, they are imprisoned in an orb-like prison called the Eye of Sin along with statues. After the wizard Shazam deems a young Thaddeus Sivana unworthy of receiving his powers due to the latter being tempted by the Sins, Sivana eventually returns as an adult to fuse with the Sins and overpower Shazam, who passes his powers to Billy Batson. Sivana and the Sins attack Batson, but he shares his powers with his foster siblings, who help him defeat Sivana and re-imprison the Sins.
 The Seven Deadly Sins reappear in their statue states in Shazam! Fury of the Gods. It is shown that since their defeat they have been covered in graffiti and other items. It is also shown that Gluttony has a button on his stomach in his statue state that, when pressed, reveals a passageway to library within the Rock of Eternity behind Wrath.

Video games
Wrath, Gluttony, Envy, and Pride appear as unlockable playable characters in Lego DC Super-Villains as part of the "Shazam! Movie DLC" pack. Additionally, all save for Envy also serve as bosses.

References

External links
 Seven Deadly Enemies of Man at DC Comics Wiki

1940 comics debuts
DC Comics supervillain teams
Characters created by Bill Parker (comics)
Characters created by C. C. Beck
Fictional demons and devils
Seven deadly sins in popular culture
DC Comics demons
Captain Marvel (DC Comics)